Pompeii is a ruined Roman city near modern Naples in the Italian region of Campania.

Pompeii, Pompei may also refer to:

Places 
 Pompei, a modern Italian city near the ruins of the Roman city
 Pompeii, Michigan, an unincorporated community in Gratiot County, Michigan, U.S.

Arts, entertainment, and media

Films
 Pompeii (film), a 2014 action-adventure film by Paul W. S. Anderson
 Live at Pompeii, a 2017 live album and film by David Gilmour
 Pink Floyd: Live at Pompeii, a 1972 concert documentary film by Pink Floyd
 Pompeii: The Last Day, a 2003 UK television docudrama
 Pompei (2019 film), a 2019 French language film

Music

Groups and labels
 Pompeii (band), an American indie rock band

Albums
 Pompeii (Cate Le Bon album), 2022
 Pompeii (album), a 1977 album by Triumvirat
 Pompeii (EP), a 2007 EP by Beirut

Songs
 "Pompeii" (song), a 2013 song by British band Bastille
 "Pompeii", a 2001 song by E.S. Posthumus from Unearthed
 "Pompeii", a 2000 song by Sleater-Kinney from All Hands on the Bad One

Other uses in arts, entertainment, and media
 Pompeii (novel), a 2003 novel by Robert Harris, or the cancelled film adaptation
 Pompei: The Legend of Vesuvius, a 2000 historical adventure video game

Other uses
 SS Pompeji, a Second World War German merchant ship
 Roberto Pompei (born 1970), Argentine footballer
 Pompeii, a version of the Ancient Roman Gladius sword

See also
 Pompeii in popular culture
 
 Pompee (disambiguation)
 Pompeia (disambiguation)
 Pompeianus (disambiguation)
 Pompeius (disambiguation)
 Pompey (disambiguation)
 Pompeya (disambiguation)